Jeanne of Saint-Pol (died 1407) was the only daughter of Waleran III of Luxembourg and his first wife Maud Holland, and thus a step-granddaughter to Edward, the Black Prince through her mother's side.  Her maternal grandmother was Joan of Kent.
In 1402 she married Anthony, Duke of Brabant (d. 1415) killed at Agincourt by English archers, fighting against her distant cousin Henry V of England. She was the mother of John IV, Duke of Brabant (1403-1427) and Philip of Saint-Pol (1404-1430).

References

1407 deaths
House of Valois-Burgundy-Brabant
Year of birth unknown